List of special schools in Hong Kong

Special Needs schools
Buddhist To Chi Fat She Yeung Tat Lam Memorial School
Caritas Jockey Club Lok Yan School
Caritas Lok Jun School
Caritas Lok Kan School
Caritas Lok Yi School
Caritas Resurrection School
CCC Kei Shun Special School  (Semi-grammar)
CCC Mongkok Church Kai Oi School  (Semi-grammar)
Chi Yun School
Choi Jun School (Semi-grammar)
Chun Tok School
Ebenezer New Hope School
Ebenezer School
Evan China Fellowship Holy Word School
Haven of Hope Sunnyside School
Heung Hoi Ching Kok Lin Association Buddhist Po Kwong School
Hong Kong Red Cross John F. Kennedy Centre
Hong Kong Red Cross Margaret Trench School
Hong Kong Red Cross Princess Alexandra School
Hong Kong Red Cross Hospital Schools
HKSYC & IA Chan Nam Chong Memorial School
Hong Chi Lions Morninghill School
Hong Chi Morninghill School, Tsui Lam (Semi-grammar)
Hong Chi Morninghill School, Tuen Mun (Semi-grammar)
Hong Chi Morninghope School, Tuen Mun
Hong Chi Morningjoy School, Yuen Long
Hong Chi Morninglight School, Tuen Mun
Hong Chi Morninglight School, Yuen Long
Hong Chi Pinehill School
Hong Chi Pinehill No.2 School
Hong Chi Pinehill No.3 School
Hong Chi Winifred Mary Cheung Morn School
Hong Kong Christian Service Pui Oi School
Jockey Club Hong Chi School
Jockey Club Sarah Roe School
Ko Fook Iu Memorial School the Spastics Association Hong Kong
Lutheran School for the Deaf
Mary Rose School
Mental Health Association of Hong Kong - Cornwall School
Po Leung Kuk Centenary School
Po Leung Kuk Law's Foundation School
Po Leung Kuk Mr. and Mrs. Chan Pak Keung Tsing Yi School
Po Leung Kuk Yu Lee Mo Fan Memorial School
Rotary Club of Hong Kong Island West Hong Chi Morninghope School
Rhenish Church Grace School
Society of Anaesthetists of Hong Kong B. M. Kotewall Memorial School
Society of Anaesthetists of Hong Kong Jockey Club Elaine Field School
Society of Anaesthetists of Hong Kong Ko Fook Iu Memorial School
Salvation Army Shek Wu School
Sam Shui Natives Association Lau Pun Cheung School
Saviour Lutheran School
Shatin Public School
Tseung Kwan O Pui Chi School
Tung Wah Group of Hospitals Kwan Fong Kai Chi School
Tung Wah Group of Hospitals Tsui Tsin Tong School

Hospital schools
Alice Ho Miu Ling Nethersole Hospital Red Cross School
Caritas Medical Centre Red Cross School
Duchess of Kent Hospital Red Cross School
Kowloon Hospital Red Cross School
Kwai Chung Hospital Red Cross School
Kwong Wah Hospital Red Cross School
North District Hospital Red Cross School
Pamela Youde Nethersole Eastern Hospital Red Cross School
Prince of Wales Hospital Red Cross School
Princess Margaret Hospital Red Cross School
Queen Elizabeth Hospital Red Cross School
Queen Mary Hospital Red Cross School
Tseung Kwan O Hospital Red Cross School
Tuen Mun Hospital Red Cross School
United Christian Hospital Red Cross School
Yan Chai Hospital Red Cross School
Yaumatei Child Psychiatric Centre Red Cross School

Schools for Social Development
Caritas Pelletier School
Hong Kong Juvenile Care Centre Chan Nam Cheong Memorial School
Marycove School
Society of Boys' Centres Chak Yan Centre School
Society of Boys' Centres Hui Chung Sing Memorial School
Society of Boys' Centres Shing Tak Centre School
Tung Wan Mok Law Shui Wah School

See also
List of primary schools in Hong Kong
List of secondary schools in Hong Kong
List of universities in Hong Kong
List of international schools in Hong Kong

External links
Hong Kong School Directory - Special schools (Chinese)
Hong Kong Red Cross Hospital Schools (Chinese)

Lists of schools in Hong Kong
Education in Hong Kong
 
Hong Kong